Nairobi Gymkhana Club is a cricket ground and team in Nairobi, Kenya.  It hosted two matches during the 2003 Cricket World Cup.  The ground has a capacity of 7,000 people. It is located north of the central business district, but not far from it. The ground is the main cricket venue in the country and the only one which could in any way be described as a major ground.

Cricket

The ground is home to a cricket team of the same name, which is one of the oldest cricket clubs in Kenya. Earlier the ground was called Suleman Verjee Indian Gymkhana having been donated by the Suleman Verjee family at a time when no recreational facilities of scale were available to Indians in Kenya. The land was allocated by the Governor of Kenya to the Indian Association in 1927.

The ground is home to one of Kenya's oldest and most influential clubs, the Gymkhana has hosted colonial and other important matches since the early 1900s but it really began to develop as Kenya became a serious force in world cricket in the 1990s.

It has become the main cricket ground in Kenya and hosts International games for the National team. It was at this ground, that Shahid Afridi scored the (then) fastest ODI century in 1997 from just 37 balls.

Investment in the ground accelerated with ICC grants which enabled it to host the 2000 ICC Champions Trophy although since then it has suffered from a lack on investment resulting from Kenya's internal problems. The ground itself is a mixture of grass banking and wooden stands, with a modern pavilion on one side and a new media centre, constructed for the 2000 tournament, at one end.

As with many such clubs in Kenya, the Gymkhana is home to a variety of other sports as well as providing comfortable accommodation. Situated almost 5,500 feet above sea level, it is one of the highest first-class grounds.

Facilities

The Gymkhana club also has an small inside area with a badminton court and further in, an outdoor area with a swimming pool and a restaurant.

Transportation

Nairobi Gymkhana is situated a 20-minute taxi ride and is about 15 km from the airport. Parking near the ground is limited.

List of Centuries

One Day Internationals

List of five-wicket hauls

One Day Internationals

Twenty20 Internationals

Notes

References

External links
 Cricinfo
 CricketArchive

Asian-Kenyan culture in Nairobi
Indian-Kenyan culture
Kenyan club cricket teams
Cricket grounds in Kenya
2003 Cricket World Cup stadiums
Sports venues in Kenya
Sport in Nairobi
Multi-purpose stadiums in Kenya